The 1995 World Snooker Championship (also referred to as the 1995 Embassy World Snooker Championship for the purposes of sponsorship) was a professional ranking snooker tournament that took place between 14 and 30 April 1995 at the Crucible Theatre in Sheffield, England. The tournament was sponsored by cigarette manufacturer Embassy.

Overview
 Stephen Hendry won his fifth world title beating Nigel Bond 18–9.  This was Hendry's fourth consecutive title, breaking Steve Davis' previous Crucible record of three.
 Hendry made the third 147 maximum break in the history of the tournament during his semi-final against Jimmy White.
 Before the first round match between Jimmy White and Peter Francisco, there were unusual gambling patterns on a 10–2 win for White and betting was suspended shortly before the match. A betting investigation was held and Francisco was banned for five years.
 Future world champion John Higgins made his debut in this tournament. He lost in the first round to Alan McManus. Another debutant, Andy Hicks, reached the semi-finals, knocking out six time former champion (and #2 seed) Steve Davis en route. 
 Until 2020 this was the last World Championship to start on a Friday and finish on a Sunday, rather than starting on a Saturday and finishing on the "May Day" Bank Holiday, the first Monday in May, as is tradition.

Prize fund
The breakdown of prize money for this year is shown below:
Winner: £190,000
Runner-up: £115,000
Semi-final: £57,000
Quarter-final: £29,000
Last 16: £15,500
Last 32: £8,750
Highest break: £16,000
Maximum break: £147,000
Total: £1,132,000

Main draw 
Shown below are the results for each round. The numbers in parentheses beside some of the players are their seeding ranks (each championship has 16 seeds and 16 qualifiers).

Century breaks
There were 30 centuries in the 1995 Embassy World Championship. Stephen Hendry made the third maximum break in the championship's history and became the first to go on to win the title after making a 147 break. Hendry's 12 centuries in the tournament beat the record of 10 set by Joe Davis in 1946 and equalled his own record for a ranking event, set at the 1994 UK Championship.

 147, 133, 128, 124, 121, 119, 114, 105, 103, 103, 101, 100  Stephen Hendry
 136, 117, 100  Andy Hicks
 129, 123, 115, 110  John Parrott
 117  Tony Drago
 115, 111, 101  Nigel Bond

 112, 111  Ronnie O'Sullivan
 108, 107  Peter Ebdon
 103  Dave Harold
 100  Alan McManus
 100  Darren Morgan

References

1995
World Championship
World Snooker Championship
Sports competitions in Sheffield
April 1995 sports events in the United Kingdom